Samuel Gruber is the name of:
 Samuel H. Gruber, shark biologist and founder of the American Elasmobranch Society
 Samuel D. Gruber, American art and architectural historian